"Ten Thousand Men of Harvard" is the most frequently performed of Harvard University's fight songs.
Composed by A. Putnam of Harvard College's class of 1918, it is among the fight songs performed by the Harvard Glee Club at its annual joint concert with the Yale Glee Club the night before the annual Harvard-Yale football game, as well as at the game itself. It is also played or sung at other athletic meets or other intercollegiate contests, usually by the Harvard University Band.

To acquaint incoming freshmen with the song, early each academic year the band performs it in Harvard Yard, where most freshmen live. The football team sings it after wins, and new players are required to memorize it in both English and Latin.

In 1991, this song was one of the songs played by Mission Control to awaken the STS-37 crew.

In the 2018 film On the Basis of Sex, which portrays the life and early cases of United States Supreme Court Justice Ruth Bader Ginsburg, "Ten Thousand Men" plays as Ginsburg begins the first day of classes as one of only nine women among five hundred incoming Harvard Law School students.

Lyrics
The original lyrics are:

In 1953 a verse in dog Latin was composed by Allan R. Robinson (Harvard College class of 1954), Edward Upton (class of  1953), and Charles Lipson (class of 1954), consisting of a nonsensical sequence of Latin clichés:

(Illegitimum non carborundum is the Harvard Band's motto.)
Other verses have lewd dog Latin lyrics (obscured by loud drumming), or just the syllable la repeated over and over.

See also
Fight Fiercely, Harvard
Harvardiana

References

External links
A video of the Harvard University band performing the song
audio and lyrics to Harvard fight songs, Harvard University Band

Ivy League fight songs
American college songs
Harvard University